Anaphes nipponicus is a species of fairyfly from Eastern Asia. It is an egg parasitoid of the beetle Oulema oryzae.

References

Mymaridae
Insects described in 1932